The Bargagli-Ferriere Tunnel is a  tunnel located on the SP 225 road near Genoa, Italy. It was opened on 15 June 1971 as part of a  toll road originally numbered T3. On 22 July 1989 this road, built to complement the SS 225, was renumbered and part of the SS 225 was renumbered SP 77. The designation T3 is no longer used.

Road tunnels in Italy
Tunnels completed in 1971